The 2015–16 1. FC Nürnberg season is the 116th season in the club's football history.

Review and events
In 2015–16 the club plays in the 2. Bundesliga.

The club also took part in the 2015–16 edition of the DFB-Pokal, the German Cup.

Friendly matches

Competitions

2. Bundesliga

League table

Results summary

Matches

Promotion play-offs

DFB-Pokal

Overall

Sources

External links
 2015–16 1. FC Nürnberg season at Weltfussball.de 
 2015–16 1. FC Nürnberg season at kicker.de 
 2015–16 1. FC Nürnberg season at Fussballdaten.de 

Nuremberg
1. FC Nürnberg seasons